Music Millennium is an independent record store located in Portland, Oregon. Its founding in 1969 supports claims that it's the oldest continually-operating record store in the Pacific Northwest. Music Millennium is considered an iconic Portland business and a "national leader in the music-selling industry."

History

At one time, Music Millenium had three stores: one at the original eastside location, which opened on March 15, 1969, a store in Northwest Portland, and a classical music-only store located next door to the main eastside location.  The classical-music-only store, known as Classical Millennium, opened in 1977.

The northwest location, which closed in September 2007,  was known for being a pioneer in in-store performances, which started in 1989 as part of the business's 20th anniversary celebration. They proved so popular they were made a regular feature under the management of Fred Seegmuller, who had spent many years cultivating connections within the local music scene.The Oregonian describes Music Millennium as an iconic Portland business and a "national leader in the music-selling industry." 

Among the many musicians and bands the store hosted were Randy Newman (in March 1989), as well as Richard Thompson, Brandi Carlile, Everclear (in 1997), The Shins, Elliott Smith (in September 1998), The Decemberists, Throwing Muses, and Weezer. However, a scheduled in-store performance by The Smashing Pumpkins in 2000 was moved to a music venue in downtown Portland following unusual requests from the band's management team that included a stipulation that the staff would have to remove several CD bins. 

In 2009, Music Millennium was given the ninth spot in Spin magazine's list of the 15 best independent record stores in the country. Current owner Terry Currier also coined the term "Keep Portland Weird," which has become a rally slogan for the city and its culture. Currier is considered "The Father of Portland's Weird Movement."

References

External links 

 
 Store profile (in PDF format) from the CIMS website
 "Music Millennium Spins Portland's Family Album", Portland Tribune, November 15, 2012.
 1999 Interview with owner Terry Currier from Willamette Week

1969 establishments in Oregon
Companies based in Portland, Oregon
Music retailers of the United States
Privately held companies based in Oregon
Retail companies established in 1969